Vincent Laurensz van der Vinne (1686, Haarlem – 1742, Haarlem) was an 18th-century painter of the Northern Netherlands.

Biography
According to the RKD he was the son of Laurens van der Vinne and the grandson of his namesake, known for landscapes, especially of his native Haarlem.
Many of his paintings are in the collection of the Frans Hals Museum.

References

Vincent Laurensz. van der Vinne on Artnet

1686 births
1742 deaths
18th-century Dutch painters
18th-century Dutch male artists
Dutch male painters
Artists from Haarlem